Donte Deayon (born January 28, 1994) is a former American football cornerback. He played college football at Boise State, and was signed by the New York Giants as an undrafted free agent in 2016 before signing with the Los Angeles Rams in 2018.

College career
Deayon played college football for the Boise State Broncos, as a 150-pound cornerback. He was named to the All-Mountain West Second-team for three straight seasons.

Professional career

New York Giants
Deayon signed with the New York Giants as an undrafted free agent on May 6, 2016. He was waived on September 3, 2016 and was signed to the practice squad the next day. He was released on October 13, 2016. He signed a reserve/future contract with the Giants on January 9, 2017.

On September 2, 2017, Deayon was waived by the Giants and was signed to the practice squad the next day. He was promoted to the active roster on October 12, 2017. He was placed on injured reserve on November 27, 2017 after suffering a fractured forearm.

On October 16, 2018, Deayon was waived by the Giants to make room for wide receiver Bennie Fowler.

Los Angeles Rams
On December 12, 2018, Deayon was signed to the Los Angeles Rams practice squad.

Deayon signed a reserve/future contract with the Rams on February 6, 2019. He was waived during final roster cuts on August 31, 2019, but was re-signed the next day to the Rams' practice squad. He was promoted to the active roster on November 13, 2019.

On March 30, 2020, Deayon was re-signed to a one-year contract. He was featured on Hard Knocks which focused on both of LA's teams, the Rams and the Chargers.

On September 5, 2020, Deayon was released from the Rams and signed to the practice squad the next day. He was placed on the practice squad/injured list on October 28, and restored back to the practice squad on November 25. He was elevated to the active roster on January 15, 2021, for the team's divisional playoff game against the Green Bay Packers, and reverted to the practice squad after the game. On January 18, 2021, Deayon signed a reserve/futures contract with the Rams.

On August 31, 2021, Deayon was waived by the Rams and re-signed to the practice squad the next day. He was promoted to the active roster on October 19, 2021. Deayon won Super Bowl LVI when the Rams defeated the Cincinnati Bengals.

Retirement
On March 2, 2023, Deayon officially announced his retirement via Instagram.

References

External links

Living people
1994 births
African-American players of American football
Players of American football from California
Sportspeople from Rialto, California
American football cornerbacks
Boise State Broncos football players
New York Giants players
Los Angeles Rams players
21st-century African-American sportspeople